Monte Santa Maria Tiberina is a comune (municipality) in the province of Perugia in the Italian region Umbria, located about 40 km northwest of Perugia.

References

External links
 Official website

Cities and towns in Umbria